The  is a DC electric multiple unit (EMU) train type operated by West Japan Railway Company (JR West) on the Osaka Loop Line in Osaka, Japan, since December 2016. The trains replaced the ageing 103 series and 201 series trains.

Design
The eight-car trains have stainless steel bodies, and the exterior livery features orange highlights. Each car has three pairs of sliding doors per side, unlike the 103 and 201 series trains which have four pairs per side.

Formation
The trains are formed of eight cars formed as follows, with all cars motored (only one motored bogie per car).

Car 2 has two WPS28E single-arm pantographs, and cars 5 and 8 each have one.

Car 4 is designated as a women-only car.

Interior
Passenger accommodation feature longitudinal bench seating throughout, with priority seating at one end of each car, and a wheelchair/stroller space at the opposite end. The passenger saloons use LED lighting, with the lighting in car 4 (women-only car) adjusted to have a more orange "tungsten lighting" tinge to distinguish it from other cars. On car 8, the seats closest to the doors are removed to improve passenger circulation. Passenger information announcements are provided in two languages, and information screens are in four languages (Japanese, English, Chinese, and Korean), with pairs of screens over each door, and pairs at either end of the cars. WiFi service is also provided.

History
Details of the new trains on order were first announced by JR West in December 2014. A total of 21 eight-car sets (168 vehicles) were scheduled to be introduced between fiscal 2016 and 2019, entirely replacing the fleet of twenty-three 103 and 201 series trains. The first trainset, LS01, was unveiled to the press at the Kinki Sharyo factory in Osaka on 24 June 2016, and delivered to JR West on 30 June.
 The trains entered revenue service on 24 December 2016.

Build details 

The build details for the fleet are as follows.

Gallery

References

External links

 JR West press release (8 December 2014) 

Electric multiple units of Japan
West Japan Railway Company
Train-related introductions in 2016
Kawasaki multiple units
1500 V DC multiple units of Japan
Kinki Sharyo multiple units